The 1952 Rhode Island Rams football team was an American football team that represented Rhode Island State College (later renamed the University of Rhode Island) as a member of the Yankee Conference during the 1952 college football season. In its second, non-consecutive season under head coach Hal Kopp, the team compiled a 7–1 record (3–1 against conference opponents), finished in a three-way tie for the conference championship, and outscored opponents by a total of 215 to 85. The team played its home games at Meade Stadium in Kingston, Rhode Island.

Schedule

References

Rhode Island
Rhode Island Rams football seasons
Yankee Conference football champion seasons
Rhode IslandRams football